Anthony Evelyn Melbourne Ashley  (24 July 1836 – 16 November 1907) was British barrister and Liberal politician. He was private secretary to Lord Palmerston and later published a biography of him. After entering Parliament at a by-election in 1864, Ashley served under William Ewart Gladstone as Parliamentary Secretary to the Board of Trade from 1880 to 1882 and as Under-Secretary of State for the Colonies from 1882 to 1885.

Background and education
Ashley was the third child and second son of Anthony Ashley-Cooper, 7th Earl of Shaftesbury and Lady Emily Cowper, eldest daughter of Peter Cowper, 5th Earl Cowper and sister of William Cowper-Temple, 1st Baron Mount Temple. He was educated at Harrow and Trinity College, Cambridge.

On William Cowper-Temple's death in 1888, he inherited a 10,000 acre estate on the Mullaghmore Peninsula in Sligo, around Classiebawn Castle. He would spend part of every year there.

Legal and political career
Ashley was private secretary to Lord Palmerston from 1858 to 1865 and worked as a barrister on the Oxford Circuit from 1865 to 1874. He sat as Liberal Member of Parliament for Poole from 1874 to 1880 and for Isle of Wight from 1880 to 1885 and served under William Ewart Gladstone as Parliamentary Secretary to the Board of Trade from 1880 to 1882 and as Under-Secretary of State for the Colonies from 1882 to 1885. He was also an Ecclesiastical and Church Estates Commissioner from 1880 to 1885, a Verderer of the New Forest and High Sheriff of Sligo in 1889. In 1891 he was sworn of the Privy Council. His publications include the Life of Lord Palmerston.

He later stood unsuccessfully for the Liberal Unionist Party in the Glasgow Bridgeton by-election in 1887 and 1888 Ayr Burghs by-election

Family
Ashley married Sybella Charlotte Farquhar, daughter of Sir Walter Farquhar, 3rd Baronet, on 28 July 1866. They had two children:

Wilfred William Ashley, later Baron Mount Temple (13 September 1867 – 3 July 1939)
Lillian Blanche Georgiana Ashley (27 June 1875 – 14 September 1939), married Hercules Pakenham.

Following Sybella's death on 31 August 1886 he married Lady Alice Cole, daughter of William Cole, 3rd Earl of Enniskillen on 30 June 1891. Ashley died in November 1907, aged 71. Lady Alice Ashley died on 25 August 1931 They had one son:

Anthony Henry Evelyn Ashley (1895 - 14 January 1921) - Educated Harrow School, Magd College and Captain 2nd Battalion Coldstream Guards - Died of wounds received in action in 1916≠

References 

    5. ≠Harrow Register 1885 -1949 - term 1907/3

External links 
 

1836 births
1907 deaths
People educated at Harrow School
Alumni of Trinity College, Cambridge
Younger sons of earls
English biographers
Members of the Privy Council of the United Kingdom
Liberal Party (UK) MPs for English constituencies
UK MPs 1874–1880
UK MPs 1880–1885
Members of Parliament for the Isle of Wight
Evelyn
Liberal Unionist Party parliamentary candidates
Parliamentary Secretaries to the Board of Trade
Church Estates Commissioners